The Lament for Uruk, also called the Uruk Lament or the Lament for Unug, is a Sumerian lament. It is dated to the Isin-Larsa period.

History
The Lament for Uruk is one of five known Mesopotamian "city laments"—dirges for ruined cities in the voice of the city's tutelary goddess, recited by elegists called gala. It was inspired by the Lament for Ur.

Text
The Lament is 260 lines long, being composed of 12 kirugu (sections, songs) and 11 gišgigal (antiphons).

Numbered by kirugu, the lament is structured as follows:
storm of Enlil (storm in Uruk)
storm of Enlil (storm in Uruk)
storm of Enlil (storm in Sumer)
weeping goddess; the poet addresses Sumer
weeping goddess; the poet addresses Uruk
weeping goddess; the poet addresses Uruk (?)
lost
lost
lost
lost
prayer; the poet addresses the gods
prayer; the poet addresses Inanna

It is composed in the standard emegir dialect of Sumerian.

See also
The Lament for Sumer and Ur
The Lament for Ur
The Lament for Eridu
The Lament for Nippur

References

External links
Full text in Sumerian
Full text (transliteration) at ETCSL (Electronic Text Corpus of Sumerian Literature)
Translation at ETCSL
English translation

20th-century BC literature
Sumerian texts
Isin-Larsa period
Uruk